Herman Friedrich Voltmar (1707 – 6 May 1782) was a Danish composer.

He was the eldest son of the oboist Johan Voltmar. The family moved to Denmark around 1711. His three brothers were also artists: composer Johan Foltmar, and painters Christian Ulrik Foltmar and Christoffer Foltmar.

At a young age he was employed by the crown prince and later Christian VI in 1738 as a musician in the Royal Chapel. In addition to his permanent salary he received some extra pay, which suggests that he also had served as soloist in more private contexts at court. He also composed and wrote poetry. At the wedding of the crown prince (later King Frederik V) Voltmar wrote a large epic in German.

In 1770, at the age of 63, Voltmar was dismissed from the Royal Chapel.

See also
List of Danish composers

References
This article was initially translated from the Danish Wikipedia.
 Article in DMT by Erling Winkel 1942 Section 1 (Danish)
 Article in DMT by Erling Winkel 1942 section 2 (Danish)

External links
 

Danish composers
Male composers
Foltmar family
1707 births
1782 deaths
18th-century composers
18th-century male musicians